The Bendigo Advertiser (commonly referred to as "The Addy") is an Australian regional newspaper. It is the daily (Monday–Saturday) newspaper for Bendigo, Victoria, and its surrounding region. The paper is published by Australian Community Media with a circulation between 5,000 and 7,000 depending on the day of publication.

First published in 1853, the Bendigo Advertiser has undergone many changes since its inception, including a move to tabloid format and a change in name from The Bendigo Advertiser to just The Advertiser before settling on its current name from 3 April 2010.
 
In November 1918 the paper was purchased by the proprietors of its competitor The Bendigo Independent, which amalgamated the two titles under the banner of The Bendigo Advertiser.

The Bendigo Advertiser currently delivers news as a printed newspaper, digital paper and on its website and social media.

Currently, the Bendigo Advertiser employs about 45 staff in Bendigo, however like all Australian Community Media publications some of the tasks are shared with staff across other locations.

The printing of the paper is now done in Wendouree, along with The Courier, The Wimmera Mail-Times, The Age and other Australian Community Media publications.

The Bendigo Advertiser's discontinued sister paper, the Bendigo Miner, was delivered free to most homes in Bendigo on Thursdays and was "old news" oriented.

The Bendigo Advertiser'''s parent company, Rural Press Limited, was taken over by Fairfax Media in 2007. It is currently owned by Australian Community Media.

References

External links
Official website
 
 Digitised World War I Victorian newspapers from the State Library of Victoria

Bendigo
Newspapers published in Victoria (Australia)
1853 establishments in Australia
Publications established in 1853
Daily newspapers published in Australia
Newspapers on Trove
Mass_media_in_Bendigo